Maria Isadora Bianca Soler Umali (born March 2, 2000), professionally known as Bianca Umali, is a Filipino actress, television host, singer, dancer, and endorser.

Early and personal life 
Maria Isadora Bianca Soler Umali was born on March 2, 2000 in Parañaque, Metro Manila. She is her parents' only child. She has older half-siblings from her parents' past relationships: two half-sisters from her mother and three half-brothers and one half-sister from her father. Growing up, she was raised by her paternal grandmother. Her mother died of breast cancer in 2005 and her father died of a heart attack five years later. She currently lives in a hometown in Parañaque. Umali also has relatives in Malolos, Bulacan. She attended Veritas Parochial School (renamed Veritas Catholic School) in Parañaque City.

Umali dated Miguel Tanfelix from 2014 to 2017. In 2022, actor Ruru Madrid confirmed that he and Umali have been dating for four years. In December 2020, Umali became a member of Iglesia Ni Cristo.

Career

As a commercial model and endorser 
Umali started her career as a commercial model at age two. She appeared in several TV commercials such as EQ Diapers and Nestle Ice Cream. She was also a product endorser for the children's clothing line of Natasha.

In 2021, Umali became an endorser for Bench.

As a host and actress 
In 2009, at age nine, Umali signed under GMA Network on an exclusive contract and became one of the hosts of a child-oriented show Tropang Potchi. In the same year, she had a cameo role as an orphan on Darna and portrayed the role of young Nancy Rosales on the TV series Kaya Kong Abutin Ang Langit.

In 2011, she signed a management contract under Sparkle GMA Artist Center.

From 2017 onward, she portrayed Lawiswis in Mulawin vs. Ravena, Crisanta in Kambal, Karibal, Sahaya in the TV show of the same name, Farrah in Legal Wives and Irene in the second installment of Mano Po Legacy.

Recording artist 
In 2018, Umali signed a recording contract under GMA Music. As of 2021, she had released two songs: "Kahit Kailan" and "Itigil Mo Na".

Discography

Singles

Filmography

Television
TV series

Anthologies

TV specials

Various shows

Film

Awards and nominations

References

External links
 
 Sparkle profile

2000 births
Living people
21st-century Filipino actresses
Actresses from Metro Manila
Filipino child actresses
Filipino female models
Filipino film actresses
Filipino people of Spanish descent
Filipino television actresses
Participants in Philippine reality television series
Tagalog people
Members of Iglesia ni Cristo
Converts to Unitarianism from Catholicism
People from Parañaque
GMA Network personalities
GMA Music artists
Filipino television variety show hosts